Effie Frederikke Nicoline Octavia Hegermann-Lindencrone (1860–1945) was among Denmark's most notable porcelain artists. She devoted her entire life to decorating porcelain at Bing & Grøndahl's factory. She adopted the Art Nouveau style, with subjects such as aquatic plants, seaweed, birds and fish, often depicted in carved scenes on her vases. Her work is included in the collections of the several art museums, including the National Gallery of Denmark, the Victoria and Albert Museum, and the Art Institute of Chicago.

Biography
Born on 27 August 1860 in Hillerød, Effie Frederikke Nicoline Octavia Hegermann-Lindencrone was the daughter of Diderik William Hegermann-Lindencrone ((1817–1885) and Amalie Wilhelmine Sehested (1831–1928). While studying at the Arts and Crafts School for Women under Pietro Krohn, she met Fanny Garde who became her lifelong companion.

Together with Garde, in 1885 she worked at G. Eifrig's ceramics workship in Valby before joining Bing & Grøondahl's factory the following year where they decorated the Heron Set, pioneering the firm's underglaze technique. The set was successfully exhibited at Copenhagen's Nordic Exhibition in 1888 and at the Exposition Universelle in Paris in 1889. As a result, the firm was able to develop underglaze as its main approach, popularizing its blue, transparent porcelain. 

Thereafter the two companions were permanently employed at Bing & Grøndahl's where they shared a studio, becoming female exceptions to work which at the time was usually carried out by men. No doubt influenced by her factory director Jens Ferdinand Willumsen, she developed her own more plastic decorative style, pioneering the use of plants as a subject in underglaze porcelain. She developed carving in the porcelain as a means of emphasizing her designs. In the 20th-century, she went on to work on freer sculptural forms with seaweed, birds and fish in her vase designs.

Hegermann participated in Bing & Grøndahl exhibitions over the years, including those in Berlin (1910–1911) and New York (1927). Her works are exhibited in several major art museums.

Effie Hegermann-Lindencrone died in the Frederiksberg district of Copenhagen on 17 December 1945 and was buried in Garrison Cemetery, Copenhagen.

Gallery

References

External links
Examples of Hegermann-Lindencrone's work on Artnet
 Collection of Effie Hegermann-Lindencrone´s works

1860 births
1945 deaths
Porcelain painters
19th-century Danish painters
20th-century Danish painters
Danish women painters
20th-century Danish ceramists
Danish women ceramists
People from Hillerød Municipality